KGAR-LP (93.3 FM) is a high school radio station broadcasting a variety music format. Licensed to Lemoore, California, United States, the station serves the Visalia-Tulare area.  The station is currently owned by Lemoore Union High School District.

References

External links
 

GAR-LP
High school radio stations in the United States
Lemoore, California
GAR-LP